Antaxius pedestris is a species of "bush crickets" belonging to the family Tettigoniidae. It was originally described by Johan Christian Fabricius under the scientific name of Locusta pedestris.

Subspecies
Subspecies include:
 Antaxius pedestris apuanus Nadig, 1958 - occurs in Italy, Austria and Switzerland
 Antaxius pedestris pedestris (Fabricius, 1787) - occurs in France, Italy, Austria and Switzerland

Distribution
This species is present in Pyrenees of Spain and in the western and southern Alps of Austria, France, Italy and Switzerland.

Habitat

Description

The basic color of the body is dark brown, gray brown or dark gray with light whitish or yellow to light gray drawings. Pronotum is tinged with white on the lateral margins. Abdomen is long, thick and strong. Wings are very short in the females, while in males they protrude 3–4 mm out from under the pronotum.

Cerci of the males are unusual. They are whitish, flattened and internally toothed. All pairs of the powerful legs bear small spines on the lower part.

Biology
Adults can be found from July to October. They feed on plants and insects, mainly small locusts. Eggs are laid in the ground.

References

 Fabricius (1787), Mantissa insectorum exhibens species nuper in Etruria collectas a Ptro Rossio, Pisis, Polloni

External links
 Orthoptera Species
 Orthoptera

Tettigoniidae
Taxa named by Johan Christian Fabricius
Insects described in 1787
Orthoptera of Europe